Oxaenanus is a genus of moths of the family Erebidae. The genus was erected by Charles Swinhoe in 1900.

Species
Oxaenanus brontesalis (Walker, [1859]) Borneo, north-east Himalayas, Myanmar, Thailand, Peninsular Malaysia, Sumatra, Philippines
Oxaenanus kalialis Swinhoe, 1900 Borneo, Sumatra
Oxaenanus kerangatis Holloway, 2008 Borneo
Oxaenanus parvikalialis Holloway, 2008 Borneo
Oxaenanus picticilia (Hampson, 1896) Sri Lanka

References

Herminiinae